Murray Harold Protter (February 13, 1918 – May 1, 2008) was an American mathematician and educator, known for his contributions to the theory of partial differential equations, as well as his well-selling textbooks in Calculus.

Protter earned a M.Sc. in mathematics at University of Michigan (1937) and a Ph.D. at Brown University on a thesis entitled "Generalized Spherical Harmonics" advised by Lipman Bers (1946). During the World War II era, he studied the aeroelasticity and  flutter of military air planes at the Vought aircraft company in Stratford, Connecticut (1943–45). Since his graduation, he worked as assistant professor at Syracuse University (1947–51), was a researcher at Institute for Advanced Study in Princeton (1951–53) and at University of California at Berkeley (1953–88) where he also was the chairman (1962–65). He also was the 
Miller Research Professor (1959, 1967) and  executive director of the Miller Institute for Basic Research in Science (1981–83).
He was the father of operations researcher Philip Protter.

Protter developed self-paced learning of mathematics. For American Mathematical Society he was a long-time member (1941–) serving as
treasurer (1968–72) and editor of the book review column.

Students 

 Amy Cohen-Corwin

Books
Calculus with Analytic Geometry:  A first Course (1964). With Charles B. Morrey, Jr.
Intermediate Calculus (1971, 1985). With Charles B. Morrey, Jr.
A First Course in Real Analysis (1976, 1991). With Charles B. Morrey, Jr.
Basic Elements of Real Analysis (1998).
Maximum Principles in Differential Equations (1967, 1999). With Hans Weinberger

References

20th-century American mathematicians
21st-century American mathematicians
University of Michigan alumni
Brown University alumni
Syracuse University faculty
University of California, Berkeley faculty
People from Brooklyn
1918 births
2008 deaths
Mathematicians from New York (state)